Voisenon is a commune in the Seine-et-Marne department, in the Île-de-France region in north-central France.

Little village, located 39 kilometres south-east from the center of Paris, Voisenon was mainly known for its 12th century abbey, and then for its renowned local figure, Claude-Henri de Fusée de Voisenon, academician and abbot. Still dedicated to cereal growing, it now enjoys the advantages of its nearest city, Melun, while keeping a country-style atmosphere.

Inhabitants of Voisenon are called Voisenonais.

History

Origins
The etymology is likely to indicate a Gaulish presence, but no evidence of this has been found yet.

Fief and earldom
The first mention of the place appears in the 12th century. During the Middle Ages, Voisenon was the Fusée family's fief and was attached to the crown lands of France.

The fall
The Fusée lost the estate in 1790 and 1791.

Contemporary
In 1949, the Château du Jard was given to the Association des paralysés de France, and used as a vocational school for persons with motor disability.

Demographics
In 2007, a total of 1,108 inhabitants lived in Voisenon, according to the official census.

Transport
The nearest railway station is Melun station, which is an interchange station on Paris RER line D, on the Transilien R suburban rail line, and on several national rail lines.
It is located 27 kilometres from Paris-Orly Airport, and 50 kilometres from Paris-Charles de Gaulle Airport.

See also
Communes of the Seine-et-Marne department

References

External links

Official site 

Communes of Seine-et-Marne